The Roman Catholic Diocese of Miri (Lat: Dioecesis Mirensis) is a diocese of the Latin Church of the Roman Catholic Church in Malaysia. Situated north-eastern region of the Archdiocese of Kuching, of which it is a suffragan diocese. St. Joseph's Cathedral in Miri serves as both the diocesan cathedral and the seat of bishop.

In 1959, when the Vicariate was established, Anthony Denis Galvin, a Mill Hill priest, was appointed as the first Apostolic Vicar until his death in 1976. Anthony Lee Kok Hin, a local priest from Miri, was appointed as the second Apostolic Vicar and subsequently become the first bishop of Miri in 1977 when Pope Paul VI elevates the Vicariate into full diocese status. In 2013, following his resignation, Pope Francis granted Rev. Fr. Richard Ng, a Kuching-born priest, as his successor and he was installed as the second bishop of this diocese in 2014.

History
Originally erected in 1959, as the Apostolic Vicariate of Miri, the diocese was formed from the Vicariate of Kuching.

The present Catholic community in the country finds its roots in the ministry of the Missionary Society of St. Joseph (Mill Hill Missionaries) They started schools all throughout Miri, starting with Good Shepherd School, at Claude Town (or present day Marudi).

After the Vicariate of Miri was established and, in the following year, Father Anthony D. Galvin (who was a Mill Hill Father himself) was consecrated the first bishop of the Miri Vicariate. He was ordained by Pope John XXIII in Rome on 5 May 1960.

Approximately 6 years later, on 2 January 1966, Father Anthony Lee (who was the first priest from Miri at that time) was ordained.

Pope Paul VI then established a new Church province in East Malaysia on 31 May 1976, and Miri Vicariate was raised to the level of a Diocese.

On 20 May 1977, Pope Paul VI appointed Father Anthony Lee as the first bishop of the Diocese of Miri, and he was ordained bishop in St. Joseph's Cathedral, Miri, on 20 Nov and the Diocese of Miri was officially proclaimed on the same day. The diocese is currently a suffragan of the Archdiocese of Kuching.
On 11 November 1997, it lost its territory to the North of it (Brunei), to establish Apostolic Prefecture of Brunei. (Currently the Apostolic Vicariate of Brunei)

In accordance with the Code of Canon Law, Pope Francis accepted the resignation of Bishop Anthony Lee Kok Hin on 30 October 2013 and appointed Father Richard Ng from the Archdiocese of Kuching to succeed him. Bishop Richard Ng was ordained and installed the third Bishop of the Diocese on 25 January 2014, the Feast of the Conversion of St. Paul.

Ordinaries
 Anthony Denis Galvin, M.H.M. † (5 April 1960, appointed − 5 September 1976, died)
 Anthony Lee Kok Hin (30 May 1977, appointed − 30 October 2013, retired)
 Richard Ng (30 October 2013, appointed, 25 January 2014, Ordained − )

Priests
 Msgr. Francis Kuleh Usat
 Rev. Gabriel Chiong
 Rev. Justin Dan
 Rev. Sylvester Ding Ibau
 Rev. Joseph Ding
 Rev. Philip Empalah
 Rev. Peter Hwang Yiek Siong
 Rev. Damian Lalo
 Rev. Andy Lee
 Rev. Johnny Francis Ho Fung Fei
 Rev. Peter Mering
 Rev. Michael Sia
 Rev. Vincent Shim
 Rev. Sylvester Ngau Juk
 Rev. Martin Vincent Sta
 Rev. Henry Saleh
 Rev. Ronald Jimmy
 Rev. Kevin Chundi
 Rev. Liam Durrant, MHM
 Rev. Christu Kollabathina, MHM
 Rev. John McAulay, MHM

Parishes
 St. Joseph's Cathedral, Miri
 Church of Mater Dei, Lutong
 Church of St. Dominic and the Rosary, Taman Tunku
 Church of St. Edmund, Limbang
 Church of St. Martin, Lawas
 Church of St. Anthony, Bintulu
 Church of St. Peter, Tatau

See also 
 Catholic Church in Malaysia

References 

 

Christian organizations established in 1959
Miri
Roman Catholic dioceses and prelatures established in the 20th century